Laminacauda nana is a species of sheet weaver found in Chile. It was described by Millidge in 1991.

References

Linyphiidae
Spiders described in 1991
Spiders of South America
Invertebrates of Chile
Endemic fauna of Chile